The 2001–02 Primeira Liga was the 68th edition of top flight of Portuguese football. It started on 11 August 2001 with a match between Varzim and Benfica, and ended on 6 May 2002. The league was contested by 18 clubs with Boavista as the defending champions.

Sporting CP won the league and qualified for the 2002–03 UEFA Champions League third qualifying round, along with Boavista, who qualified for the second round. Porto and Leixões from the third division qualified for the 2002–03 UEFA Cup; in opposite, Salgueiros, Farense and Alverca were relegated to the Segunda Liga. Mário Jardel was the top scorer with 42 goals. Until 2021, this remained the last season where Sporting CP won the title and where neither Porto nor Benfica won before Sporting CP won the 2020–21 season ending their 19-year drought and 19-year reign of Porto and Benfica.

Promotion and relegation

Teams relegated to Segunda Liga
Campomaiorense
Desportivo das Aves
Estrela da Amadora

Campomaiorense, Desportivo das Aves and Estrela da Amadora, were consigned to the Segunda Liga following their final classification in 2000–01 season.

Teams promoted from Segunda Liga
Santa Clara
Varzim
Vitória de Setúbal

The other three teams were replaced by Santa Clara, Varzim and Vitória de Setúbal from the Segunda Liga.

Teams

Stadia and locations

Managerial changes

League table

Results

Top goalscorers

References

External links
 Portugal 2001-02 – RSSSF (Jorge Miguel Teixeira)
 Portuguese League 2001/02 – footballzz.co.uk
 Portugal – Table of Honor – Soccer Library 

Primeira Liga seasons
Port
1